Gauruncus curvatus is a species of moth of the family Tortricidae. It is found in Ecuador (Napo Province).

The ground colour of the forewings is cream, with ochreous admixture, especially along the dorsum. The markings are brownish. The hindwings are greyish brown.

Etymology
The species name refers to the form of the sacculus and is derived from Latin curvatus (meaning bent).

References

External links

Moths described in 2006
Fauna of Ecuador
Euliini
Moths of South America
Taxa named by Józef Razowski